The Canadian Institute for the Study of Antisemitism (CISA) is one of seven institutes in the world dedicated to the scholarly study of antisemitism.  Founded in 2010 by Canadian historian Catherine Chatterley, the Institute is a national organization based in Winnipeg.

CISA's Annual Shindleman Family Lecture has been delivered by US State Department Special Envoy Hannah Rosenthal, Deborah Lipstadt, Daniel Jonah Goldhagen, Alvin Rosenfeld, Jeffrey Herf, Irwin Cotler, David Harris, and James Carroll.

CISA facilitates research, scholarship, and teaching on the nature and history of antisemitism, in both its classical and contemporary forms, and provides public education programming on this subject matter for Canadians. In 2016, CISA established the first academic journal for the study of antisemitism, Antisemitism Studies, published by Indiana University Press. The editorial board includes prominent scholars such as Yehuda Bauer, David Nirenberg, Deborah Lipstadt, and the Editor-in-Chief is Catherine Chatterley.

The organization's website states that it "is a registered Canadian charity committed to the uprooting of hatred and stereotypes through progressive education and by working cooperatively to build a more humane future for all people."

CISA's Director and Chairman were invited to accompany the Canadian government to Israel as part of its official delegation in January 2014. In 2021, FAST Fighting Antisemitism Together merged into CISA. Its programs, Voices into Action and Choose your Voice, have been expanded under the banner of CISA's human rights program and are offered free of charge to teachers in over 22,000 Canadian schools.

See also 
 Institute for the Study of Contemporary Antisemitism, Indiana University
 Vidal Sassoon International Center for the Study of Antisemitism, Hebrew University
 Stephen Roth Institute, Tel Aviv University 
 Birkbeck Institute for the Study of Antisemitism, Birkbeck, University of London
 Center for Research on Antisemitism, Technische Universität Berlin
 Institute for the Study of Global Antisemitism and Policy (ISGAP)

External links 
 Canadian Institute for the Study of Antisemitism (CISA)
 Antisemitism Studies

References 

Learned societies of Canada
2010 establishments in Manitoba
Scientific organizations established in 2010
Educational institutions established in 2010
Centers for the study of antisemitism